Leonel Felipe Alves Alves (born 28 September 1993) is an Andorran professional footballer who plays as a defensive midfielder.

Club career
Alves has played club football for Santa Coloma, FC Andorra, Sant Julià, and La Massana.

International career 
Alvesif made his international debut for the Andorra national team in 2014.

References

External links

Leonel Alves at La Preferente

1993 births
Living people
Andorran footballers
Association football midfielders
Andorra international footballers
UE Santa Coloma players
FC Andorra players
UE Sant Julià players
FS La Massana players
Primera Divisió players